Halala may refer to:

 one hundredth of a Saudi Riyal 
 Halala USA, a non-profit for Luhya people
 Faustinopolis, an ancient city in Cappadocia
 Nikah Halala, a type of Muslim marriage
 The offspring of a kohen with certain of the women he is forbidden to marry.

See also
"Halala South Africa" (Congratulations South Africa), a song on the Lihl' Ixhiba Likagogo album
Drakula halála, the original name of the 1923 film Dracula's Death